"Forever After All" is a song by American country music singer Luke Combs, It was released on October 23, 2020, as part of What You See Ain't Always What You Get, the deluxe edition of his second studio album, What You See Is What You Get. Following its release, the song broke Apple Music and Spotify's streaming records for a country song.

Commercially, the song debuted at number two on the US Billboard Hot 100, behind Ariana Grande's "Positions", and number one on the Hot Country Songs chart for the week ending November 7, 2020. It is his highest charting song to date on the Hot 100.

Background and writing
"Forever After All" was the first song Combs wrote after he and his wife, Nicole, moved into their house in Tennessee. It was written in January 2019, and was further co-written by Combs' frequent collaborators, Rob Williford and Drew Parker. This was beneficial to Combs as he found it "easier  to open up with guys that you've written with a lot". The song was first previewed by Combs on August 27, 2020, on the video-sharing app TikTok. He later shared a video on Instagram featuring some of the lyrics. Combs recalled, "once we teased the song, people's reaction was really awesome. I don't think we expected it to be that big". He said they were "trying to hold [the song] back for a long time and not play it". The song is a continuance  of "Beautiful Crazy" and "Better Together", which were both dedicated to his wife, whom he married in August 2020. He stated, "You could write a generic love song, and not to say it couldn't be done, but my wife's impact on my life has weighed heavily on the outcome of these songs".

Composition
"Forever After All" is a "tender", "romantic" midtempo country love song. It sees Combs harmonizing about his wife's unique attributes, and how, unlike material things, their love "last forever after all". The ballad reflects on how love is everlasting, even through death.

Live performances
On the day of the song's release, Combs, accompanied with a full band, performed it on Facebook Live along with the rest of the songs on the deluxe album. The performance benefited the MusiCares foundation.

Commercial performance
"Forever After All" set the record for the biggest first day streams for a country song on Apple Music, reaching number one on the platform's global chart. It also earned the most first day streams for a country song by a solo artist on Spotify. The song debuted at number one on the Hot Country Songs chart and number two on the Billboard Hot 100 chart.

"Forever After All" reached number one on the Billboard Country Airplay chart dated June 5, 2021, making Combs the second artist to score six number one singles from a single album, and tying Luke Bryan for the most from an album.

Charts

Weekly charts

Year-end charts

Certifications

References

2020 songs
2021 singles
Luke Combs songs
Songs written by Luke Combs
Country ballads
Billboard Hot Country Songs number-one singles of the year
Songs about marriage
Columbia Nashville Records singles